Zoe Tuck is an American author and poet. She was born in Texas, moved to the Bay Area in 2008, and is now living in Massachusetts.

Career

Works 
Tuck has been featured on poets.org, Michigan Quarterly Review, and was published in the book Troubling the Line (2013), a collection of poetry published by Nightboat Books. In 2013, she performed her piece from Troubling the Line for RE@DS, a segment University of California, Berkeley's Art Museum, BAMPFA, L@TE series. She has also authored Terror Matrix (2014), and has an unpublished manuscript titled Summer Arcana (2014). She worked at Small Press Distribution for several years after moving into the Bay Area. She also co-curated Condensery Reading Series. She is currently working on co-curating for But Also house reading series. Tuck is also a co-editor of "HOLD: a journal", along with Tessa Micaela Landreau-Grasmuck and Cheena Marie Lo. Tuck is also an editor for the publishing group Timeless, Infinite Light.

Teaching 
She co-taught a class with novelist Laura Moriarty. The class was called Vampire Poetics and was held at the Bay Area Public School. She will also be teaching an upcoming class on ghosts with Zach Ozma.

Acting 
Tuck will be performing in an upcoming film by Brittany Billmeyer-Finn, titled The Meshes: An Iteration in 2 Acts. In the film, tuck portrays the filmmaker, Maya Deren.

References

External links 
 HOLD: a journal
 Fanzine - Summer Arcana

Living people
American women poets
University of Massachusetts Amherst alumni
Transgender writers
Year of birth missing (living people)